Tsaghkavan is a village in the Ijevan Municipality of the Tavush Province of Armenia.

Etymology 
The village was previously known as Melikgyugh and Melikgegh.

References

External links 

Populated places in Tavush Province